Aidonia is a Jamaican reggae musician.

It is also the placename of several villages in Greece:
 Aidonia, Grevena, a village in Grevena
 Aidonia, Corinthia, a village in Corinthia
 Aidonia, Andros, a village in Andros